Assaulted Nuts may refer to:

Assaulted Nuts (TV series), British-American sketch comedy show
"Assaulted Nuts" (The King of Queens), episode of the American sitcom